The Women's time trial H1-3 road cycling event at the 2016 Summer Paralympics took place on 14 September at Flamengo Park, Pontal. Eight riders from seven nations competed.

The H1 category is for cyclists using handcycles because of lower limb dysfunction or amputation.

Results : Women's road time trial H1-3

References

Women's road time trial H1-3